Immunoglobulin lambda joining 3 is a protein that in humans is encoded by the IGLJ3 gene.

References

Further reading 

 
 
 
 
 

Genes
Human proteins